Toi Ohomai Institute of Technology is a New Zealand tertiary education institute with campuses in Rotorua, Tauranga, and other towns in the Bay of Plenty and South Waikato regions. It was formed in May 2016 after the amalgamation of Bay of Plenty Polytechnic and Waiariki Institute of Technology. Toi Ohomai is the third largest of the 16 ITPs (Institutes of Technology and Polytechnics) in New Zealand.

History
The Waiariki Community College was opened in Rotorua in April 1978.  Throughout the 1970s and 1980s, the college established additional campuses in Tokoroa, Whakatane, Taupo, Turangi and Kawerau. In 1998, the college was renamed Waiariki Institute of Technology. The institute provided education in various areas, such forestry, Māori studies, business management, journalism, sport and music.

In 1982, the Bay of Plenty Community College was opened in Tauranga (later known as Bay of Plenty Polytechnic). The college initially ran various administration, engineering, and agriculture courses, later expanding to other areas such as hospitality, tourism and television. By 1991, the polytechnic had expanded to two main centres - Windermere Campus in Poike, and Bongard Centre in downtown Tauranga. In 2010, a total of 9,443 students were studying at Bay of Plenty Polytechnic.

On 1 May 2016, these two institutions merged to form Toi Ohomai Institute of Technology. The new name was gifted by local iwi, and means "to aim high and achieve great heights; to be awakened by learning."

On 1 April 2020, Toi Ohomai Institute of Technology was subsumed into New Zealand Institute of Skills & Technology alongside the 15 other Institutes of Technology and Polytechnics (ITPs).

References

External links 

Toi Ohomai Institute of Technology

Te Pūkenga – New Zealand Institute of Skills and Technology
Education in the Bay of Plenty Region
Tauranga
Rotorua
2020 disestablishments in New Zealand